Misha Libertee (born June 13, 1985, as Mikhail Tsaturian (also can be spelled as Michael, Tsaturyan) is a Russian artist and multidisciplinary designer of Armenian descent. Member of the Creative Union of Artists of Russia. Misha's works are distinguished by bright, positive subjects and deliberately commercial aesthetics. His individual style and sense of humor make his work go viral on the Internet, and soak to offline, and make them incredibly popular with an audience not previously interested in contemporary art.
Mikhail's most famous works are the 23-meter #Slonik at the Burning Man 2019, #Kraken on the embankment of Zaryadye Park, #Serna in Krasnaya Polyana, near Sochi, and a virtual exhibition of collectible bricks in Minecraft, which the artist held in the midst of lockdown 2020.
The track record of the young author includes collaborations with charity funds and international brands, as well as participation in major foreign festivals and art fairs.
Misha created his virtual avatar with artificial intelligence—Misha Cybertee. In the nearest future, it will replace his biological prototype not only in the metaverse but also in the physical world. Additionally, Mikhail is also known for his works in public art that covers various social issues, such as extinction of animals or environmental protection.

Early life 

Misha was born in June 13, 1985, in a small town of Yessentuki, Southern Russia. He was bred in creative atmosphere since both his parents worked in a fashion industry. No wonder that from his early age Mikhail got into drawing. Popular characters from movies, comic books and video games were his favorite subject.
At that time in Russia, comic books were pretty uncommon, so he had no choice but to imagine his own alternative stories and draw comic books for himself and his friends.

First steps 
Upon graduating from high school Mikhail moved to Saint Petersburg, the art capital of Russia. It was the time when his art broke out from sketchbooks to occupy city walls and human bodies. Making tattoos and hand-painted t-shirts helped Miлрфшl to earn some money for a graphic tablet and to transfer his creativity to digital media.
The works created in digital were published and sold as prints on various marketplaces, which made it possible to feel the demand for his work among a wide audience.
At this time, the style had been born. Most of Mikhail's works are made in the mashup technique—mixing objects and characters in a witty and ironic way. In Misha's work, Renaissance classics are easily integrated into modern pop culture, religion intersects with technology, and poetry meets pornography. Often these combinations can be completely different and unexpected, for example, Teenage Mutant Ninja Turtles become characters in the frescoes of the Sistine Chapel, or Osama bin Laden taking a selfie for Instagram. Many of these works went viral on the Internet and were later leaked offline.

Life in China 

In 2012, Mikhail moved to Shenzhen, Southern China, where he started his career as an industrial designer. During his life in China Mikhail walked a long path from a regular designer in local companies developing toys for kids to a creative director at an international brand producing sport accessories and wearable gadgets. Mikhail has several patents pending for his inventions in product design. He has also produced his own collection of streetwear clothing and created a line of official licensed products for 2014 Winter Olympics.

China also became a place where Mikhail truly ventured into the art world. His works took part in the exhibitions and festivals in Shanghai, Guangzhou, Shenzhen and Hong Kong.

Artist career 

At the end of 2015, Misha returned to Russia and began freelancing by producing sculptures, paintings and complex art installations, under someone else's authorship. Many of these works participated in prestigious exhibitions and were sold at auctions around the world. In 2016 and 2017, he directed the production of art objects in the sculpture park La Collection'air in Lucerne, Switzerland, where Mikhail made his debut as an author. Combining the experience gained in industrial design and his passion for art, Misha turned to sculpture and created his first public art piece—the D-1000, a mashup of Michelangelo's David in the form of a liquid metal terminator T-1000 from the Terminator 2 movie.

In 2018, according to the author himself, he "stopped serving other people's dreams" and completely focused on his own work. Misha decided to start his journey with the most grandiose event in the art world—Burning Man, where he showed a 5-meter tall Holoquarium virtual gallery. As it was planned by the author, Holoquarium was supposed to become a platform for digital artists from all over the world who had not previously had the opportunity to show their works in the desert. But due to logistical issues, the plans were not destined to come true in full and the facility was built 20 minutes before the burning of Man and a day before the end of the festival.
The next year, Misha approached the preparations more responsibly and began to prepare his return to Burning Man with a new work—a giant inflatable neon green elephant called #Slonik.

#Slonik 
#Slonik is a 23 m (75 ft) tall art installation. Designed to draw attention to the problem of abuse and extinction of elephants in Africa and Asia.
First introduced in May 2019 in one of the Moscow's public parks. In the summer of 2019, #Slonik appeared at the Faces & Laces and Usadba Jazz festivals, after which Misha and his friend Andrey Levin carried it across the ocean to the Burning Man festival.

#Kraken 
In October 2020, Misha was nominated for the First Moscow Art Prize. As part of this nomination, an exhibition was held in Moscow's Zaryadye Park, where Mikhail presented his new public art work #Kraken.

#Serna 
On the World Wildlife Day, at the Krasnaya Polyana resort, Misha Libertee presented the #Serna public art object—a 5-meter tall inflatable sculpture depicting a Caucasian chamois as a vivid reminder to local tourists that they were only guests of the nature and we should think about its inhabitants first of all.

Exhibition in Minecraft 

In April 2020, at the beginning of the pandemic, Misha together with the Darkart Gallery held the first ever author's exhibition in Minecraft, and presented the Libertile project.
"The exhibition in Minecraft seemed to me a very successful and logical solution during quarantine time. I thought—where to hold an exhibition of bricks if not in Minecraft, where everything consists of voxel "bricks", says the author.
The showroom was built in the shape of a brick and the interior decoration was inspired by the interiors of Drake's mansion from the Toosie slide video, which the Canadian rapper also filmed during quarantine.
In addition, famous Russian stand-up comedians performed at the opening of the exhibition in video game. On the second day of the opening there was a performance from the student theater 6/33 and the modern composer Kirill Richter gave the first live piano concert in history in a video game.
In the first weekend, more than thousand players visited the exhibition in the game and another 500 thousand viewers watched the broadcast on Twitch and VK.
After the removal of quarantine restrictions, Misha recreated all the works in physical form and showed them at his personal exhibition at the Winzavod Center for Contemporary Art in Moscow.

Collaborations 

In the period from 2020 to mid-2021, Misha managed to collaborate with brands such as Adidas, ECCO, Puma, FC Spartak, Comedy Club, etc. In October 2020, Mikhail Tsaturyan's personal exhibition "The Birth of a Legend" was held at the Museum of Russian Impressionism dedicated to the 130th anniversary of the Borjomi brand. In March 2021, at LikeLikeFest in Moscow, Misha created a photo zone with augmented reality "Content Jungle" for one of the largest Russian mobile operators, MegaFon.
In April 2021, at an event dedicated to the 75th anniversary of the JBL, Misha presented for the first time some of the works from his stained glass collection MVP featured key figures in the history of music over the past 75 years.
In May 2021, Mikhaill tried his hand at NFT, and the artist's collaboration with Gazprombank. As part of this collaboration, Misha created a brick of shredded bank cards, as well as a virtual copy of this work in NFT, as a symbol of the bank's transition from plastic cards to digital payment systems. Both works were presented at the Startup village in Skolkovo.
In 2021, Misha was selected to participate in Costasera Contemporary Art by Masi.

References

Living people
1985 births
Russian contemporary artists
Russian designers
Burning Man